The 1992–93 NBA season was the 47th season for the Boston Celtics in the National Basketball Association. This marked the first season since the 1978–79 season that Hall of Fame player Larry Bird was not on the team. This was also the final season for long-time Celtics All-Star forward Kevin McHale, as he would retire the following off-season. During the off-season, the Celtics signed free agent Xavier McDaniel, and traded top draft pick Jon Barry to the Milwaukee Bucks in exchange for Alaa Abdelnaby in December. However, the team got off to a bad start losing eight of their first ten games, as Celtics guard John Bagley would suffer from injuries and miss almost the entire season, and Ed Pinckney only played just seven games due to a knee injury. Despite the bad start, the Celtics would post a 7-game winning streak in January, hold a 26–24 record at the All-Star break, and would then post a nine-game winning streak in March to finish second in the Atlantic Division with a solid 48–34 record (only 3 games behind the previous year, when Bird was on the team). The Celtics also qualified for the playoffs for the fourteenth consecutive season.

Reggie Lewis led them in scoring averaging 20.8 points per game, while McDaniel averaged 13.5 points and 6.0 rebounds per game, and Kevin Gamble provided the team with 13.3 points per game. In addition, Robert Parish averaged 12.6 points, 9.4 rebounds and 1.4 blocks per game, and Dee Brown provided with 10.9 points, 5.8 assists and 1.7 steals per game. McHale contributed 10.7 points and 5.0 rebounds per game off the bench, but would briefly feud with head coach Chris Ford near the end of the season over his lack of playing time, which did not help with causing distractions and lack of focus for the Celtics.

The Celtics held home court advantage in the Eastern Conference First Round of the playoffs against the 5th-seeded Charlotte Hornets, but during Game 1 of the series, Lewis collapsed on the court, (Lewis would never again play in a Celtics uniform, and would die three months later, before the next season began). Boston held on to win Game 1, but (minus Lewis) lost the next three games, and thus the series.

Following the season, Joe Kleine signed as a free agent with the Phoenix Suns, and Bagley signed with the Atlanta Hawks.

Draft picks

Roster

Regular season

Season standings

y – clinched division title
x – clinched playoff spot

z – clinched division title
y – clinched division title
x – clinched playoff spot

Record vs. opponents

Playoffs

|- align="center" bgcolor="#ccffcc"
| 1
| April 29
| Charlotte
| W 112–101
| Xavier McDaniel (21)
| Douglas, Parish (9)
| Sherman Douglas (11)
| Boston Garden14,890
| 1–0
|- align="center" bgcolor="#ffcccc"
| 2
| May 1
| Charlotte
| L 98–99 (2OT)
| Kevin McHale (30)
| Robert Parish (16)
| Sherman Douglas (10)
| Boston Garden14,890
| 1–1
|- align="center" bgcolor="#ffcccc"
| 3
| May 3
| @ Charlotte
| L 89–119
| Kevin Gamble (19)
| Alaa Abdelnaby (6)
| Sherman Douglas (8)
| Charlotte Coliseum23,698
| 1–2
|- align="center" bgcolor="#ffcccc"
| 4
| May 5
| @ Charlotte
| L 103–104
| Robert Parish (24)
| Robert Parish (9)
| Sherman Douglas (9)
| Charlotte Coliseum23,698
| 1–3
|-

Player statistics

Awards and records

Transactions

References

See also
 1992–93 NBA season

Boston Celtics seasons
Boston Celtics
Boston Celtics
Boston Celtics
Celtics
Celtics